Doris Davenport, sometimes styled as doris davenport (born 29 January 1949), is a writer, educator, and literary and performance poet. She wrote an essay featured in This Bridge Called My Back: Writings by Radical Women of Color entitled "The Pathology of Racism: A Conversation with Third World Wimmin." She also focuses her efforts on poetry and education.

Davenport identifies as African American, Appalachian, Feminist, and LGBTQ, which all heavily influence her writings. Today, she holds many workshops and poetry performances.

Early life and education
Davenport was born in Gainesville, Georgia, and raised in Cornelia, Georgia. She often mentions her life growing up in the Appalachian foothills and has written many poems published in the Appalachian Heritage. She holds a Bachelor of Arts (BA) in English from Paine College. She earned a Mater of Arts (MA) in English from the University at Buffalo. Her Doctorate of Philosophy (PhD) in Literature was obtained from the University of Southern California.

Themes in Writing

Feminism
In a 40 year old essay, "The Pathology of Racism: A Conversation with Third World Wimmin," she speaks of racism as a disease (which negatively affects white feminists).  davenport projects a vision of wellness among all feminists, worldwide, and states that there are many other issues to concentrate on.  In more recent essays, davenport focuses on the poetry of African American wimmin, most recently, Brenda Marie Osbey of New Orleans, LA.

Sexual Identities
One of her influences as a writer is through her multiple identities. For instance, asa self-identified lesbian, Davenport incorporates poetry from her life that revolves around her prioritizing women. Her self-published collection of poems it's like this is her first published book of poetry, immersed in a spiritual-lesbian worldview.

Culture
davenport speaks often of her heritage and in many of her works, she expresses the joy and richness  that comes along with being African American. Her themes follow her communities, the effects of modern feminism on her community, and the personal successes she's faced through her lifetime. Growing up in the south, davenport heavily incorporates her upbringing to reflect her childhood. Many of her works express her life living in the Appalachian Foothills as she has close ties to the area.

Career
Today, davenport defines herself (pronouns: person, per) as an Independent Poet-Scholar,Teacher & Writer. "Per" also has extensive teaching experience. Most recently, Dr. Davenport was associate professor of English at Albany State University and later, at Stillman College. To date, she has published twelve books of poetry and continues to give performances. She currently resides in Northeast Georgia, on Traditional Cherokee Homelands.

Works

Poetry collections
request. Imaginary Friend Press, 2014.
ascent: poems. CreateSpace Independent Publishing Platform, 2011.
a hunger for moonlight: poems. self-published, 2006.
Madness Like Morning Glories: Poems. LSU Press, 2005.
Soque Street Poems. Sautee-nacoochee Community Association, 1995.
Voodoo Chile - Slight Return: Poems. Soque Street Press, 1991.
Eat Thunder & Drink Rain: Poems. self-published, 1982.
It's Like This. self-published, 1981.

Journal articles, essays, and poems
"... Can't Go No Further/Cause You Got Me/Chained and Bound." Appalachian Heritage 36, no. 3 (2008): 56.
"Weeny (Wiener) Soup." Appalachian Heritage 36, no. 3 (2008): 52. 
"Red Dirt Blues." Appalachian Heritage 36, no. 3 (2008): 54–54.
"hog killing time." Appalachian Heritage 33, no. 3 (2005): 79–79.
"Miz Jones." Appalachian Heritage 33, no. 3 (2005): 80–81. 
"Lesson in Excitement." Appalachian Heritage 33, no. 3 (2005): 82–82. 
"Katharine Newman in the after World (s) or MELUS Goes to Hell." MELUS 29, no. 3/4 (2004): 548–553. 
"A Candle for Queen Ida." Black Music Research Journal 23, no. 1/2 (2003): 91-102. 
"Still Here: Ten Years Later..." Tilting the Tower (1999): 215–26.
"Dismantling white/male supremacy." Social Issues in the English Classroom (1992): 59–75.
"Pedagogy &/of Ethnic Literature: The Agony & the Ecstasy." MELUS 16, no. 2 (1989): 51–62.
"Dessa Rose." Black American Literature Forum 20, no. 3 (1986): 335–340.
"Waves & License."  Black American Literature Forum 17, no. 4 (1983): 177–179. 
"Black Lesbians in Academia: Visible Invisibility." Lesbian Studies, Present and Future (1982): 9-11.
"Dinner With the Orishas-Almost." Callaloo 16 (1982): 125–126.
"The Pathology of Racism: A Conversation with Third World Wimmin." This Bridge Called My Back: Writings by Radical Women of Color (1981): 85–90.

References

Living people
20th-century American essayists
20th-century American poets
20th-century American women writers
21st-century American essayists
21st-century American poets
21st-century American women writers
African-American poets
American women essayists
American women poets
LGBT people from Florida
LGBT people from Georgia (U.S. state)
American LGBT poets
Paine College alumni
People from Habersham County, Georgia
Poets from Florida
Poets from Georgia (U.S. state)
University at Buffalo alumni
University of Southern California alumni
Writers from Gainesville, Florida
1949 births
20th-century African-American women writers
20th-century African-American writers
21st-century African-American women writers
21st-century African-American writers
21st-century LGBT people